Pudussery Central is a census town town in Palakkad district in the state of Kerala, India. Pudussery Central comes under the administration of the Pudusseri gram panchayat.

Demographics
 India census, Pudussery Central had a population of 14,057 with 7,077 males and 6,980 females.

References
3.    https://www.citypopulation.de/php/india-kerala.php?adm2id=3206Census towns in Palakkad district.
Cities and towns in Palakkad district
Suburbs of Palakkad

External links

Villages in Palakkad district